The 2016 Judo Grand Prix Budapest was held at the László Papp Budapest Sports Arena in Budapest, Hungary from 25 to 26 June 2016.

Medal summary

Men's events

Women's events

Source Results

Medal table

References

External links
 

2016 IJF World Tour
2016 Judo Grand Prix
Judo
Grand Prix 2016
Judo
Judo